Kyla Anne Leibel (born October 9, 2001) is a Canadian butterfly and freestyle swimmer.

Leibel competed at the 2018 Youth Olympics and at the 2018 Pan Pacific Swimming Championships which was the first competition where she represented Canada at a senior level. She also competed at the 2019 Pan American Games where she won a silver medal in the mixed 4x100 metre medley event and a bronze medal in the women's 4x100 metre freestyle event.

References

2001 births
Living people
Canadian female butterfly swimmers
Canadian female freestyle swimmers
Pan American Games bronze medalists for Canada
Pan American Games medalists in swimming
Pan American Games silver medalists for Canada
Sportspeople from Medicine Hat
Swimmers at the 2018 Summer Youth Olympics
Swimmers at the 2019 Pan American Games
Medalists at the 2019 Pan American Games
21st-century Canadian women